Cunswick Scar is a limestone scar (cliff or steep rock face) in the Lake District, England. There are extensive views from the large cairn at the top. The scar is listed in the Scout Scar chapter of Wainwright's The Outlying Fells of Lakeland.

Fossils can be found in the limestone on the scar and Cunswick Fell. The area is also of interest for its flora and fauna: Scout Scar and Cunswick Scar have been designated a Site of Special Scientific Interest.

References

Fells of the Lake District